Jean-Michel Capoue (born 18 September 1972) is a French former professional footballer who played as a midfielder. He represented 10 different French and English clubs in a career spanning almost 20 years. While playing for AS Cannes, he appeared in both the UEFA Cup and the UEFA Intertoto Cup.

References
 
 Jean-Michel Capoue career statistics at chamoisfc79.fr
 Jean-Michel Capoue profile at foot-national.com

1972 births
Living people
Association football midfielders
Guadeloupean footballers
French footballers
Chamois Niortais F.C. players
AS Cannes players
Leyton Orient F.C. players
Fisher Athletic F.C. players
Greenwich Borough F.C. players
Évry FC players
Gazélec Ajaccio players
Angoulême Charente FC players
Entente SSG players
Ligue 1 players
Ligue 2 players